Paul Lyman (24 May 1965) is an English former professional rugby league footballer who played in the 1980s and 1990s.

Background
Paul Lyman was born in Wakefield, West Riding of Yorkshire, England.

Playing career
Lyman made his début for Featherstone Rovers on Sunday 21 November 1982, during his time at Featherstone Rovers he scored one 3-point try, and sixty-one 4-point tries, he was transferred from Featherstone Rovers to Hull Kingston Rovers in exchange for Chris Burton plus a fee to Featherstone Rovers

International honours
Lyman played for Great Britain Under-21s, and was selected for the Great Britain squad against Australia in the 1986 Kangaroo tour of Great Britain and France, but ultimately he was not selected to play in any of the test matches

Challenge Cup Final appearances
Lyman played as an interchange/substitute, i.e. number 14, (replacing left-, i.e. number 4, John Gilbert) in Featherstone Rovers' 14-12 victory over Hull F.C. in the 1983 Challenge Cup Final during the 1982–83 season at Wembley Stadium, London on Saturday 7 May 1983, in front of a crowd of 84,969.

Genealogical information
Paul Lyman is the son of the rugby league / who played in the 1960s for the Featherstone Rovers (Heritage No. 478); Ray Lyman, and he is the grandson of the rugby league footballer who played in the 1930s and 1940s for the Featherstone Rovers (Heritage No. 176); Horace Lyman.

References

External links
Horace Lyman, Ray Lyman and Paul Lyman
The Story of Wembley 1983. Part I - a featherstone rovers blog
The Story of Wembley 1983. Part II - a featherstone rovers blog
The Story of Wembley 1983. Part III - a featherstone rovers blog
The Story of Wembley 1983. Part IV - a featherstone rovers blog
The Story of Wembley 1983. Part V - a featherstone rovers blog
The Story of Wembley 1983. Part VI - a featherstone rovers blog
The Story of Wembley 1983. Part VII - a featherstone rovers blog
The Story of Wembley 1983. Part VIII - a featherstone rovers blog
The Story of Wembley 1983. Part IX - a featherstone rovers blog
The Story of Wembley 1983. Part X - a featherstone rovers blog

1965 births
Living people
English rugby league players
Featherstone Rovers players
Hull Kingston Rovers players
Rugby league locks
Rugby league second-rows
Rugby league players from Wakefield
Yorkshire rugby league team players